The 1999 Fitzgibbon Cup was the 86th staging of the Fitzgibbon Cup since its establishment by the Gaelic Athletic Association in 1912. The first-round games were held on 30 January 1999, with Garda Síochána College hosting the latter stages of the cup from 27 to 28 February 1999.

University College Cork were the defending champions.

On 28 February 1999, Waterford Institute of Technology won the Fitzgibbon Cup after beating University College Cork by 4–15 to 3–12 in the final. This was their third cup title overall and their first title since 1995.

Results

Preliminary round

First round

Quarter-finals

Semi-finals

Final

Statistics

Top scorers

Overall

In a single game

References

Fitzgibbon
Fitzgibbon Cup